John Farnum (born 5 August 1883, date of death unknown) was a Guyanese cricketer. He played in two first-class matches for British Guiana in 1903/04 and 1909/10.

See also
 List of Guyanese representative cricketers

References

External links
 

1883 births
Year of death missing
Guyanese cricketers
Guyana cricketers
Sportspeople from Georgetown, Guyana